(born 7 December 1961) is a Japanese musical composer and arranger. Oshiro currently works for Giza Studio composing and arranging music for artists such as Hayami Kishimoto, Miho Komatsu, Azumi Uehara, Rina Aiuchi, and Fayray.

Oshiro is also a lecturer for the online Oshiro Music School.

References

1961 births
Being Inc. artists
Japanese composers
Japanese music arrangers
Lecturers
Living people